Stefan Bengt Pettersson (born 22 March 1963) is a Swedish former professional footballer who played as a striker. He won the UEFA Cup with both IFK Göteborg and Ajax, and won 31 caps for the Sweden national team. He represented his country at the 1990 FIFA World Cup.

Club career 
Pettersson was born and raised in Västerås, and started his football career with the local club IFK Västerås. He began his Allsvenskan career with IFK Norrköping, before leaving for IFK Göteborg during the 1984 season. The following four years he helped Göteborg win one league title, become runners-up once, and to one UEFA Cup victory in 1987, in which he scored in the final itself against Dundee United.

In 1988, he was bought by Dutch club AFC Ajax. In the six seasons he spent with Ajax he won the league twice and the Dutch Cup once. In 1992, he won the UEFA Cup again, also scoring in the final again, this time a penalty. He returned to IFK Göteborg in 1994 and won three more league titles. The latter part of his career he had recurring knee problems, which forced him to retire in 1999.

International career 
Pettersson represented the Sweden U17, U19, and U21 teams a total of 31 times between 1979 and 1985. He made his full international debut for Sweden on 19 November 1983 in a friendly 4–0 win against Barbados, playing for 65 minutes before being replaced by Mats Jingblad. He scored his first international goal for Sweden on 31 August 1988 in a friendly 1–2 loss against Denmark. He was selected for Sweden's squad for the 1990 FIFA World Cup and played in all three games as Sweden was eliminated after the group stage following three straight 1–2 losses against Brazil, Scotland, and Costa Rica.

Pettersson scored in a friendly against Poland ahead of UEFA Euro 1992, but was not selected for the tournament. He scored his first competitive goal for Sweden in a 1994 FIFA World Cup qualifier against Bulgaria, but was overlooked for the final tournament.

He won a total of 31 caps for Sweden, scoring four goals.

Personal life
Pettersson is married to a sister of Jesper Parnevik.

Career statistics

International 

Scores and results list Sweden's goal tally first, score column indicates score after each Pettersson goal.

Honours 
IFK Göteborg

 UEFA Cup: 1986–87
 Allsvenskan: 1984, 1994, 1995, 1996

Ajax

 UEFA Cup: 1991–92
 Eredivisie: 1989–90, 1993–94
KNVB Cup: 1992–93

Individual
 Pettersson was also given the "Folkets lirare" ("People's Choice Player") award at Fotbollsgalan in 1997.

References

External links

1963 births
Living people
Swedish footballers
IFK Norrköping players
IFK Göteborg players
AFC Ajax players
Allsvenskan players
Eredivisie players
Sweden international footballers
1990 FIFA World Cup players
Sweden under-21 international footballers
Sweden youth international footballers
Swedish expatriate footballers
Expatriate footballers in the Netherlands
Swedish expatriate sportspeople in the Netherlands
Sportspeople from Västerås
Association football forwards
UEFA Cup winning players